The Northern Neck George Washington Birthplace AVA is an American Viticultural Area in eastern portion of the state of Virginia.  Wines made from grapes grown in Westmoreland, King George, Northumberland, Lancaster, and Richmond counties may use this appellation.  The area is located on a peninsula of land between the Potomac and Rappahannock rivers in the Tidewater region of Virginia and known as the Northern Neck.  This provides a climate which features more frost free days than the rest of Virginia. The tip of the Northern Neck is located at the Chesapeake Bay. The hardiness zone is 7b.

See also
 Ingleside Vineyards
 George Washington

References

External links 
 Chesapeake Bay Wine Trail

American Viticultural Areas
Geography of King George County, Virginia
Geography of Lancaster County, Virginia
Northern Neck
Geography of Northumberland County, Virginia
Geography of Richmond County, Virginia
Virginia wine
Geography of Westmoreland County, Virginia
George Washington
1987 establishments in Virginia